There have been two Finnish 6th Divisions:

 Finnish 6th Division (Winter War) 
 Finnish 6th Division (Continuation War)